John Dickson "Dick" McBride (June 14, 1847January 20, 1916) was an American Major League Baseball player from Philadelphia, Pennsylvania, who was the star pitcher and the player-manager for the Philadelphia Athletics of the National Association from 1871 through most of 1875 until Cap Anson took over as player-manager for the remaining eight games of the season.  He had a pitching record of 149 wins and 74 losses during that period.  In 1871, he went 18-5 and led Philadelphia to the NA championship.  McBride finished his major league career in 1876 when he was signed by the Boston Red Stockings of the National League after the Association failed.  He had a record of 0-4 before his career came to an end.  McBride died in Philadelphia at the age of 70, and is interred at Lawnview Cemetery in Rockledge, Pennsylvania.

In 1864, while serving in the Union Army during the Civil War, he was allowed to take a 3-day furlough to participate in a series of baseball exhibitions between clubs from Brooklyn and the local Philadelphia clubs.  It was during this time that the north's attention had turned to military defense, not baseball, so Brooklyn strategically scheduled these events hoping to take advantage of the situation to get some well sought after wins in "enemy" territory.  The presence of McBride didn't do much, as all Philly teams were beaten soundly.

See also
List of Major League Baseball career ERA leaders
List of Major League Baseball annual shutout leaders

References

External links

1847 births
1916 deaths
19th-century baseball players
Major League Baseball pitchers
Baseball player-managers
Philadelphia Athletics (NABBP) players
Philadelphia Athletics (NA) players
Philadelphia Athletics (NA) managers
Boston Red Caps players
Baseball players from Philadelphia
People of Pennsylvania in the American Civil War
Union Army soldiers
Burials at Lawnview Memorial Park